The Bravery Council of Australia Meeting 77 Honours List was announced by the Governor General of Australia on 27 August 2012.

Awards were announced for 
the Star of Courage,
the Bravery Medal,
Commendation for Brave Conduct and
Group Bravery Citation.

† indicates an award given posthumously.

Star of Courage (SC)
Senior Constable Luke Alan Anderton, Victoria Police
Clayton Trevor Giddings, New South wales

Bravery Medal (BM)
Kevin Allan Beven, Queensland
Senior Constable Peter Graham Coleman, Queensland Police
Petty Officer Ian Mark Davies of the Royal Australian Navy, Western Australia
Garry Allen Durbidge, Victoria
Paul Bronte Gatenby, New South Wales
Raymond Reginald Gorrell †, Queensland
Judith Therese Hennock, New South Wales
Derek Scott Maclucas, South Australia
Byron Alexander Masrshall, Victoria
Detective Senior Constable Steven Murphy, Victoria Police
Senior Constable Shane Francis Pedler, New South Wales Police
David James Phillips, Queensland
Timothy James Reid, New South Wales
Able Seaman Catherine Lee Smith of the Royal Australian Navy, Western Australia
Daryl Ian Tester, South Australia
Fred David Whitlock, Victoria
Senior Constable Nathan Andrew Wright, Queensland Police

Commendation for Brave Conduct
Matthew Kevin Alcock, South Australia
Martin Maria Ancone, South Australia
Sergeant James Leonard Ansell, Tasmania Police
Shaun Dylon Bailey, South Australia
Gemma Ashleigh Ball, South Australia
Anthony John Beames, New South Wales
Lisa Jane Bossley, New south Wales
Mathew Kane Boyle, South Australia
Kerby Thomas Brown, Western Australia
John William Bryce, New South Wales
Warrant Officer Class One Kenneth John Bullman, OAM of the Australian Army, Australian Capital Territory
Senior Constable Stephen William Case, New South Wales Police
Jefferey Clarke, Queensland
Robert Cockburn, New south Wales
Peter Anthony Collina, South Australia
Constable Luke Edward Colquhoun, Victoria Police
Major Patrick William Davison of the Australian Army, Queensland
Alan David Dundas †, Queensland
Stewart Dundas, Queensland
Matthew Keith Dunn, Queensland
Gary Wayne Foley, Victoria
Russell Ian Fraser, Victoria
Sergeant Iain Gillanders, Victoria Police
Lieutenant Colonel Jason James Hedges, CSC of the Australian Army, Queensland
Joseph Thomas Hickey, Tasmania
John Francis Holland, South Australia
Vu Phong Huynh, Victoria
Senior Constable Michael Andrew Jessup, Queensland Police
Tim Jones, Queensland
Raymond Eric McMillan, South Australia
Rupa Manimua, Northern Territory
Rod Marsh, Queensland
Mustafa Merdivenci, Tasmania
Bianca Kate Mills, South Australia
Tony Michael Morris, Victoria
Stephen Matthew Morrissey, Queensland
Christopher David Oates, Tasmania
Warren Alan Page, Tasmania
Steven Pauner †, New South Wales
Kenneth Pesrce, New South Wales
Matthew Thomas Pickering, South Australia
Leading Senior Constable Sean Potocki, New South Wales Police
Alan Terrence Rankin, New South Wales
Philippe Ravenel, New South Wales
Senior Constable Belinda Megan Reeves, Queensland Police
Nathan Edward Rheinberger, New South Wales
Naomi Nicole Roskell, New South Wales
Senior Constable Dennis Richard Rutland, New South Wales Police
Corporal Shawn Allan Scott of the Australian Army, New South Wales
Peter Graham Stanton, New South Wales
Zachary Peter Taylor-Nugent, New South Wales
Jason Tod Tippett, New South Wales
Warwick Todd, Victoria
Bradley Richard Tuckwell, New South Wales
Scott Alan Tunnie, Queensland
Greg Norman Turner, New South Wales
John Francis Welsh, Queensland
Neil John Wildman, Queensland
Stephen Philip Wiseman, Western Australia
Tyson James Young, South Australia

Group Bravery Citation
Kevin Allan Beven, Queensland
Fredrick Clermont, Queensland
Peter Chevathen, Queensland
Simeon Wilfred Jawai, Queensland
Raylene Anne Motton, Queensland
Ian Alfred Port, Queensland
Judith Therese Hennock, New South Wales
Senior Constable Shane Francis Pedler, New South Wales Police
Graham Thompson, New South Wales
Peter Raymond Yelland, New South Wales
Major Patrick William Davison of the Australian Army, Queensland
Lieutenant Brandon Coghill of the Australian Army, Queensland
Corporal Shawn Allan Scott of the Australian Army, New South Wales
Corporal Todd William Barnes of the Australian Army, New South Wales
Anthony William Browne, New South Wales
Vimal Chand Narayan, New South Wales
Matthew William Steen, New South Wales
Brian Anthony Evans, New South Wales
Madeline Mary Kennedy, New South Wales
Joshua Phillip Sharp, New South Wales
Jason Hurst, Queensland
Ross Terence Thorley, Queensland
Francis Albert Smidt, New South Wales

References

Orders, decorations, and medals of Australia
2012 awards in Australia